Shiksa is an often disparaging, although not always, term for a Gentile woman or girl. The word, which is of Yiddish origin, has moved into English usage and some Hebrew usage (as well as Polish and German), mostly in North American Jewish culture.

Among Orthodox Jews, the term may be used to describe a Jewish girl or woman who fails to follow Orthodox religious precepts.

The equivalent term for a non-Jewish male, used less frequently, is shegetz.

Etymology
The etymology of the word shiksa is partly derived from the Hebrew term שקץ shekets, meaning "abomination", "impure," or "object of loathing", depending on the translator. According to the Oxford English Dictionary, it came into English usage in the late 19th century from the Yiddish shikse, which is an adaptation of the Hebrew word šiqṣâ, which is derived from sheqeṣ ("a detested thing") and the feminine suffix -â. A passage in which shekets (translated as "abomination") appeared in the Talmud to refer to people (rather than non-kosher actions) can be translated as:

Several dictionaries define shiksa as a disparaging and offensive term applied to a non-Jewish girl or woman.

North American context
In North American Jewish communities, the use of "shiksa" reflects more social complexities than merely being a mild insult to non-Jewish women. It culturally evokes "the complex and layered notions of sexuality, its containment of both self-righteousness and self-loathing, the embedded yearning for and guilt of assimilation". A woman can only be a shiksa if she is perceived as such by Jewish people, usually Jewish men, making the term difficult to define; the Los Angeles Review of Books suggested there are two concepts of the shiksa, the forbidden seductress and the hag. Despite appearing in Yiddish literature for many decades, the term shiksa did not enter mainstream vernacular until the works of Philip Roth popularized it.

Severity
In North America, the term is typically considered pejorative but not a severe slur. Sometimes, response to its use has treated it as more severe. In 2009, it was recorded as a hate crime in Toronto. In 2014, Rabbi Jack Abramowitz described it as "simply indefensible", "inherently condescending, racist and misogynistic".

Israel and Orthodox context
In Israel, where there are few non-Jewish women, the word is used as a pejorative to refer to Jewish women who are not Orthodox or who demonstrate more Western behavior. In other Orthodox communities, it can be used in the same way.

In popular culture
The shiksa has appeared as a character type in Yiddish literature. In Hayim Nahman Bialik's Behind the Fence, a young shiksa woman is impregnated by a Jewish man but abandoned for an appropriate Jewish virgin woman. Her grandmother can be considered a hag form of the shiksa. More dangerous shiksas in literature include Shmuel Yosef Agnon's "Lady and the Peddler", in which a shiksa plans to eat the Jewish man she is dating, and I. L. Peretz "Monish", which sees a Jewish man fall into a hell-like place for loving a blonde woman.

As Jews populated American culture in the 20th century, more shiksa characters began to appear. Abie's Irish Rose focused on such a relationship, and the concept is mentioned in The Jazz Singer. Roth's books made the term mainstream, particularly Portnoy's Complaint in 1969. Roth placed the taboo nature of the shiksa in a cultural American Jewish context, not a religious one. His work influenced that of Woody Allen, whose films depicted the concept. In American media, including Roth and Allen, the shiksa is often associated with eating lobster. The Los Angeles Review of Books noted that with more examples of shiksa characters, particularly on television, the concept became less taboo and more of a common stereotype.

Actresses Candice Bergen and Dianna Agron have both been described as "the archetypal shiksa" based on their roles; Agron is Jewish and Bergen is not, though she speaks Yiddish.

Derivatives
In Polish, siksa or sziksa is a pejorative but humorous word for an immature young girl or teenage girl. According to Polish language dictionary from 1915, it has been defined as "pisspants"; a conflation between the Yiddish term and its similarity to the Polish verb sikać ("to piss"). In today's language however, it is roughly equivalent to the English terms "snot-nosed brat", "little squirt", and "naughty school-girl" in a humorous context.

In German, schickse roughly means a promiscuous woman, with no religious or ethnic implications.

In Victorian England, London slang included "shickster" and "shakester", alternative spellings of the same word used among low class men to refer to the wives of their direct superiors (who were still low class women). As forms of the word entered British English more popularly, the implications became further detached, meaning variously a servant; a woman of low parentage; or a prostitute. By the middle of the 20th century, the word had dropped out of usage in Britain; the Los Angeles Review of Books suggests any continued use would be by older people referring to maids. The North American word "shiksa" is not (or rarely) used in British Jewish communities.

See also
 Gentile
 Goy

Notes

References

External links 
 

Pejorative terms for in-group non-members
Jewish culture
Yiddish words and phrases
Pejorative terms for women